Clinidium valentinei is a species of ground beetle in the subfamily Rhysodinae. It was described by R.T. Bell in 1970. It is endemic to the Appalachian Mountains in the eastern United States, from northern Alabama to southwestern Pennsylvania.

Clinidium valentinei measure  in length.

References

Clinidium
Beetles of the United States
Endemic fauna of the United States
Beetles described in 1970